The Bautek Sunrise is a German high-wing, single-place, hang glider designed and produced by Bautek.

Design and development
The Sunrise is made from aluminum tubing, with the wing covered in polyester sailcloth. Its  span wing has a nose angle of 132° and an aspect ratio of 8:1.

It was certified as DHV 2-3.

Specifications (Sunrise)

References

Hang gliders